Sheikh Muhammad Tariq Rasheed, Urdu: شيخ محمد طارق رشيد, (born in Multan) is a Pakistani politician who is affiliated with Pakistan Muslim League  currently serving as Divisional General Secretary of Multan division. He has previously served as a member of the National Assembly of Pakistan from 2012-2013.

Family and education 

He completed his initial education at Millat High School and then Government College in Multan and graduated from Multan. He belonged to a poor family, his father Sheikh Muhammad Rasheed was a butcher.

Tariq Rasheed is married and has two sons. The eldest son Sheikh Hashim Rasheed is accompanying his father in politics learning and getting trained for future politics and the other son Sheikh Hassan Tariq has done his LL.M

References

External links
Tariq Rasheed defeated Liaqat Dogar in by elections.

Pakistani politicians
Year of birth missing (living people)
Living people